Armutalan is a town in Marmaris  district of Muğla Province, Turkey. Although an independent municipality it is merged to Marmaris to the southeast. The population is of Armutalan is 17365  as of 2011. Up to recent times Armutalan was a small settlement. Being very close to Marmaris, an important touristic center, it flourished and was made a seat of township in 1987.

References

External links
Wowturkey (for images)

Populated places in Muğla Province
Mediterranean Region, Turkey
Towns in Turkey
Marmaris District